Roja was an Indian Telugu language soap opera directed by Hariprasad Gattreddy aired on Gemini TV from 11 March 2019 to 27 March 2020 every Monday to Saturday at 6.00 PM IST. It is remake of Tamil television series of the same name which is being aired on Sun TV. The serial was stopped abruptly due to COVID-19 lockdown.The serial initially stars with Sharanya Turadi Sundaraj but she was later replaced by Princy B Krishnan, Munna as main protagonists and Priyanka in pivotal role. Sri Lakshmi, Jackie, Anil, and Sailatha are playing other supporting roles.The serial was stopped abruptly due to COVID-19 lockdown.

COVID-19: Outbreak
Due to COVID-19, Roja and all Gemini TV shows are on break. All serials including Roja were stopped on March 27 to give care to the production team and the cast. Roja was  stopped on Episode no.300. After that the serial was stopped permanently due to shoot restrictions in corona crisis.

Plot
Roja is a story of an optimistic girl who was raised in an orphanage. Due to some unexpected turns of events, she met with her biological father but they both don't know about the reality. On the other hand, the male lead Arun Raj, criminal Lawyer hates love and marriage but fall in love with Roja. Now, how it all happens and how Roja came to know about her biological father is what the story of the show unfolds.

Cast

Main cast
 Sharanya Turadi (Episode 1–120) as Roja Arun / Anu
 Princy B Krishnan (Episode 121–300) (Replacement of Sharanya) as Roja Arun / Anu
 Munaf "Munna" Rahman  as Arun Raj, criminal Lawyer
 Priyanka as Priya, fake Anu

Supporting cast
Jackie as Pratap (Arun, Ashwin & Deepa's father)
Sailatha as Kalpana (Arun, Ashwin & Deepa's mother)
Taruntej as Ashwin (Arun's younger brother)
Shabeena as Pooja
 Sri Lakshmi as Annapurna (Arun, Ashwin & Deepa's grand mother)
Nirmala Reddy as London Chamundeswari, Annapurna's elder sister
Anil as Chandrakanth, Roja's biological father
Dwarakesh Naidu as Satyamurthy (Roja's foster father and Premalayam Ashramam caretaker)
Gowri as Sakshi
Gopal Krishna Akella as Naveen, Arun's Assistant

Aditya as pooja's father
Durga Devi as Pooja's mother
Vijay yadav as Sambhaiah, Sakshi's uncle
Lavanya as Rajyam (Arun, Ashwin & Deepa's Aunt)
Krishna Teja as Bala Krishna (Rajyam's husband)
Nirmala as Sumathi
Sindhuja as Deepa, Arun's younger sister
Venu kshatriya as Vishal
Srinivas as Chalapathi (Chandrakanth's younger brother)
Srilatha as Triveni, Roja's mother (Cameo appearance)

Former lead
Sharanya Turadi Sundaraj as Roja (replaced by Princy B Krishnan)
Purna Sai as Santhosh, Roja's friend (deceased)
Actor Bramar as Ashwin (replaced by Taruntej)

Airing history
The serial started airing on Gemini TV on 11 March 2019. It aired every Monday to Friday at 7:30PM IST. Later, a serial named Abhilasha replaced this show at 7:30PM and pushed this serial to 6:00PM IST from 26 August 2019. The serial stopped abruptly after airing 299 episodes due to corona crisis.

Adaptations

Awards and nominations

Crossover episodes
From 18 December 2019 - 19 December 2019 in episodes 216,217 Roja had a crossover with Akka Mogudu.

References

Indian television soap operas
Telugu-language television shows
2019 Indian television series debuts
Gemini TV original programming
Telugu-language television series based on Tamil-language television series